Thomas Bull House, also known as Robert's Plantation, Redding Plantation, and Mt. Pleasant, is a historic home located in East Nantmeal Township, Chester County, Pennsylvania.  Originally built in 1715 and owned by Owen Roberts, the property was sold in 1729 to William Branson as part of the Redding Plantation, who eventually sold it to Thomas Bull. Thomas Bull was employed by the well known Van Leer family and worked at their historical Reading Furnace as the manager. The house is in three parts.  The oldest section was built about 1715.  It is part of the two-story, four bay eastern section of the stone dwelling.  The two-story, three bay, third section was probably built between 1783 and 1796.  The interior of the older part features a circular staircase that wraps around the chimney.  It is an example of late Georgian / early Federal architecture.

The farm was added to the National Register of Historic Places in 1979.

See also 
 Reading Furnace Historic District
 Van Leer Pleasant Hill Plantation

References

External links

Houses completed in 1785
Houses on the National Register of Historic Places in Pennsylvania
Georgian architecture in Pennsylvania
Federal architecture in Pennsylvania
Bull, Thomas
National Register of Historic Places in Chester County, Pennsylvania